Tapes 'n Tapes is an indie rock band from Minneapolis, Minnesota.

History
Formed in the winter of 2003 at Carleton College, the band has released four albums. First came the self-released Tapes 'n Tapes EP in 2004, followed by the full-length release, The Loon, on Ibid Records in 2005. The band signed to XL Recordings and re-released The Loon on July 25, 2006. In October 2007 the band announced finishing recording of their second album, titled Walk It Off. Walk It Off was recorded by producer David Fridmann in his Tarbox Road Studio in Cassadaga, New York. The album was released April 8, 2008. The band's most recent album, Outside, was released on January 11, 2011.

Tapes singer Josh Grier says their first album was recorded "...in the winter time at a cabin in the Wisconsin woods with no running water or toilet paper. It was a lot fun to do it on our own and get a little crazy, but it was also frustrating since we didn't really know entirely what we were doing"

Tapes 'n Tapes gained popularity after a series of write-ups on music blogs, first on EAR FARM then on sites such as Music For Robots and Gorilla vs. Bear, leading some to cite them as the most recognizable examples of a "blog band" . However, it wasn't until The Loon received a favorable review from Pitchfork Media, including a "best new music" commendation, that the band started to find success. Tapes 'n Tapes have been compared to such alternative bands as Pixies and Pavement, or the recent alt-pop phenomenon Clap Your Hands Say Yeah. After release of their self-titled EP, the band played with more well-known acts such as The Futureheads, The Streets, Metric, Calvin Johnson, and I Am the World Trade Center. The band made its American television debut on the Late Show with David Letterman on July 25, 2006, performing the song "Insistor." In 2006 the band did a Take-Away Show video session shot by Vincent Moon. They also performed at the Siren Music Festival in July of that same year. Tapes 'n Tapes performed at the Coachella Valley Music and Arts Festival in April 2007, along with bands such as Rage Against the Machine, Red Hot Chili Peppers, and Björk.

Tapes 'n Tapes' musical style varies in tempo and in influence, ranging from fast-paced polka renditions to the slower, more blues-influenced songs. The publication Music Week described the band's song "Insistor" as "Part country, part rock...possess[ing] an emotional urgency that rivals Arcade Fire. This is promising stuff."

Josh Grier has written several untitled songs for the band's next album, which was originally to be recorded in June 2007 and released in the fall of 2007, Grier told Billboard.com. During their set at the 2007 Lollapalooza festival, the band played six songs titled, according to the setlist posted on the festival's website, "Demon Apple", "Blunt", "Icedbergs", "Headshock", "Le Ruse" and "Hang Them All". The song "Icedbergs" was previously featured on the band's debut EP.

Tapes 'n Tapes were featured in a 2007 sketch on the MTV comedy program Human Giant. Aziz Ansari's character, a psychotic "Indie Marketing Guru" named Clell Tickle, pushes bloggers to feature MP3s of the band on their blogs. At one point he says, "I've decided that if you don't post that Tapes 'n Tapes MP3, I'm going to come back here tomorrow and give you a Colombian necktie."

While not on the official soundtrack, the song "Insistor" by Tapes 'n Tapes is featured in a scene in the movie Nick and Norah's Infinite Playlist. The music video for "Insistor" was directed by Dan Knight.  

"Hang Them All" appears on Minnesota Public Radio station KCMP 89.3 The Current's "Live Current Volume 4". The album is available to contributors to MPR.

The band has been honored with a star on the outside mural of the Minneapolis nightclub First Avenue, recognizing performers that have played sold-out shows or have otherwise demonstrated a major contribution to the culture at the iconic venue. Receiving a star "might be the most prestigious public honor an artist can receive in Minneapolis," according to journalist Steve Marsh.

Discography

Albums

EPs
Tapes 'n Tapes – (2004) Ibid Records

Singles

Notes

Band members
The band has four members, each of whom is named after a word in the band's name; two members of the band share the same word for their name. The band members are:
Josh Grier (Tapes 1) – guitar, vocals
Jeremy Hanson (Tapes 2) – drums
Matt Kretzman ('n) – keyboards, multi-instruments
Erik Appelwick ('n) – bass guitar

In April 2006, producer Erik Appelwick replaced previous bassist Shawn Neary. Drummer Jeremy Hanson replaced original Tapes drummer Karl Schweitz in 2005 while still a senior in high school.

References

External links
Tapes 'n Tapes official website
Tapes 'n Tapes Live Review
Tapes 'N Tapes Hit the Pavement with Exclaim! magazine
Tapes 'n Tapes interview at musicOMH.com
Pitchfork Media's review of The Loon
Interview with Josh Grier and Ashley Marie Sansotta with REAX Music Magazine
[ Tapes 'N Tapes] bio from Allmusic
Tapes 'n Tapes perform a new song, "SWM," on Radio Happy Hour
a journal by Josh Grier on the recording of Outside from InDigest

Indie rock musical groups from Minnesota
Musical groups established in 2003
XL Recordings artists